Pub. Affairs Associates, Inc. v. Rickover, 369 U.S. 111 (1962), was a United States Supreme Court case in which the Court held that the circuit court's decision should be vacated because the facts of the case were too unclear. Remanded to district court to create an "adequate and full-bodied record.".

The case concerned whether or not speeches written by Admiral Hyman G. Rickover in the course of his duties to the federal government of the United States were copyrightable. Generally, works of the United States government are not. The case spent nine years in litigation.

After the case was passed back to a district court, the Register of Copyrights, the Librarian of Congress, the Secretary of the Navy, the Secretary of Defence, and the Atomic Energy Commissioners were all added as defendants. The court ruled in Admiral Rickover's and their favor, saying that speechwriting should be considered "private business from start to finish."

See also
 Public Affairs Press

References

External links
 

1962 in United States case law
United States copyright case law
United States Supreme Court cases
United States Supreme Court cases of the Warren Court